Robert M. Knight is a rock and roll photographer that has been active for around 40 years. He is an author and the subject of the documentary film Rock Prophecies. Knight has photographed Jimi Hendrix, Stevie Ray Vaughan, Eric Clapton, Jeff Beck, Steve Vai, and Carlos Santana.

References

External links

 Robert M. Knight official website

 Publisher of Robert Knight's gallery photographs, and global distributors

Rock music photographers
American photographers
Living people
Year of birth missing (living people)